Curcuma aromatica (common name: wild turmeric) is a member of the genus Curcuma belonging to the family Zingiberaceae. Botanically close to Curcuma australasica, wild turmeric has been widely used as a cosmetic herbal in South Asia and nearby regions. In Malayalam it's is known as Kasthuri Manjal (കസ്തൂരി മഞ്ഞൾ).

Description
The wild turmeric is one among the 80 members of the plant family Zingiberaceae. The perennial foliage dies down in late autumn and the rhizomes remain dormant in winter. The inflorescence appears in early spring from the base of the rhizomes. During summer monsoon season and the immediately following weeks, the plant grows fast and vigorously. Leaves often appear even after the flowers.

Habitat
This species is found in the south Asian region, predominantly in in South India, Japan, and Sri Lanka. The chemical composition of the species grown in different areas were found to be in different quantities. It is commonly known to native to Western Ghats and has been used by South Asian communities.

Uses
Wild turmeric has rhizomes with a peculiar fragrance and cream color. The rhizomes are often used as a culinary ingredient, and in traditional medicine, for skin disorders and as an antibacterial agent. It is also commonly used in ethnic cosmetic products. As a culinary ingredient it is used in limited quantities as a natural food colour. Leaves are broad and very decorative, elliptic with a leaf stem running as long to the tip of the blade. A fresh stalk with flowers and leaves, cut to proper size and shape, can be used as a floral indoor decoration in vase for up to 10 days.

References

aromatica